Earle Wilfred Bailey OAM (born 5 October 1941) is an Australian politician. He was a member of the Queensland Legislative Assembly from 1983 to 1986.

Biography 
Bailey was born in Melbourne, Victoria, the son of W.B. Bailey-Tart and his wife Mary Ethel (née Page). His grandfather was Sir Earle Page, 11th Prime Minister of Australia in 1939. He was educated at South Grafton Primary School, The Armidale School, and Brisbane Grammar School.

After finishing his education, Bailey worked as a journalist and film producer.  Representing the National Party, he was the member for Toowong in the Queensland Legislative Assembly from 1983 until his defeat in 1986.

He was awarded the Medal of the Order of Australia in the 2001 New Year's Honours List for his services to the community of the Port Douglas region through local government, tourism, and developing the radio and television industries.

On 28 May 1966 Bailey married Penelope Edith Reilly. The couple has a son and a daughter.

References

Members of the Queensland Legislative Assembly
1941 births
National Party of Australia members of the Parliament of Queensland
Living people
Recipients of the Medal of the Order of Australia